TN (formerly known as Todo Noticias (English: All News) is an Argentine pay and streaming news television channel owned by the Clarín Group and its subsidiary, Artear. The channel began broadcasting on 1 June 1993, at 7:00 a.m. local time.

TN also has a news website, ranked as the 20th most visited in Argentina according to Alexa.

Programming
 Re Despiertos
 TTN
 TN as 6 a.m.
 TN at 10 a.m.
 Nuestra Tarde
 Esta Pasando
 TN Central
 Solo Una Vuelta Mas
 TN De Noche
 TN Fin De Semana (at weekend)
 TN Deportivo
 Desde el llano
 A Dos Voces
 Verdad/Consecuencia
 La Rosca
 Fenomenos (with Matias Bertollotti & Jose Bianco)
 Ya Somos Grandes (with Diego Leucovich)
 Palabra De Leuco (with Alfredo Leucovich)
 La Viola (with Carlos Contepomi)
 En el camino (with Mario Markic)
 TN Tecno (with Santiago Do Rego & Federico Wiemeyer)
 TN Internacional (with Jose Antonio Gil Vidal)
 Esta es mi villa (with Julio Bazan)

References

External links
 

24-hour television news channels in Argentina
Television channels and stations established in 1993
TN (TV channel)
Spanish-language websites